Coleophora albitarsella is a moth of the family Coleophoridae. It is found in most of Europe, but has not been recorded from Ireland and Greece.

Description
Adults are on wing from mid-June to August in western Europe.

The larvae feed on Clinopodium vulgare, Glechoma hederacea, Lycopus europaeus, Melissa officinalis, Melittis melissophyllum, Mentha aquatica, Mentha arvensis, Nepeta cataria, Origanum vulgare, Prunella vulgaris, Salvia pratensis, Salvia verbenaca, Satureja, Stachys and Thymus species. They create a sheath case. Towards the end there is a narrow, transparent yellowish ventral keel. The mouth angle is 50-60°. Cases are located at the leaf underside. Full-grown larvae can be found in May.

Pupation takes place from May to early June in the case, usually attached to a hard surface such as a rock or post.

References

External links
 

albitarsella
Moths of Europe
Moths described in 1849
Taxa named by Philipp Christoph Zeller